The 1935 Victorian state election was held in the Australian state of Victoria on Saturday 2 March 1935 to elect 53 of the 65 members of the state's Legislative Assembly. 12 seats were uncontested.

Background
At the 1932 state election, the United Australia Party won 31 seats, the United Country Party won 16 seats, and the Australian Labor Party won 14 seats. Since the election the UAP had lost two seats to the UCP in by-elections: Benambra on 15 October 1932, and Gunbower on 1 May 1934.

On 16 May 1933, the UAP member for Waranga, Ernest Coyle, resigned from that party and defected to the UCP.

James Vinton Smith was unendorsed by the UAP at the time of the 1932 election, and won the seat of Oakleigh as an Independent, but was fully endorsed by the party at the 1935 election.

At the end of the Parliament, the United Australia Party held 29 seats (down from 31), the United Country Party held 19 seats (up from 16), and the ALP held 14 seats (unchanged).

Results

Legislative Assembly

|}
Notes:
Twelve seats were uncontested at this election, and were retained by the incumbent parties:
UAP (4): Boroondara, Polwarth, Toorak, Upper Yarra
United Country (5): Benalla, Gippsland South, Goulburn Valley, Gunbower, Korong and Eaglehawk
Labor (2): Brunswick, Williamstown.
Independent (1): Port Fairy and Glenelg

Subsequent events
The United Australia Party and the United Country Party had entered the election as a Coalition. The coalition won a comfortable majority, winning a total 44 seats in the 65 seat assembly. UAP leader Sir Stanley Argyle was confirmed as Premier, and formed what was known as the National Ministry, which included three members of the Country Party (Albert Dunstan, John Allan and George Goudie).

On 5 March, rumours began to appear which suggested that the Country Party would demand a greater proportion of the ministry, including the Deputy Premiership, four of the eight full portfolios and at least one Honorary Minister, and it was suggested that they would challenge the UAP on the floor of the Assembly if this was not granted.

On 15 March, the United Country Party overthrew leader Murray Bourchier, and replaced him with Albert Dunstan.

On 19 March, a joint conference of the Country Party's central council and the parliamentary party voted in a secret ballot to discontinue the party's association with Argyle's National Ministry, and Dunstan, Allan and Goudie resigned from Argyle's cabinet the next day.

At 10.30pm on Thursday 28 March, after a spirited sixteen-hour debate, Dunstan moved a motion of no confidence against Argyle's government. With the support of the Country Party, the Labor Party and three independents, the motion was carried on division by 40 votes to 23.

Argyle informed the Governor of Victoria, Lord Huntingfield, of his ministry's resignation on 29 March. The Governor sought a meeting with Dunstan, but postponed the decision to commission him as Premier until the following Tuesday (2 April), due to his doubts about Dunstan's ability to form a stable ministry with Labor support. Dunstan was appointed Premier on 2 April 1935 and formed a minority Country Party government with Labor Party support in return for some legislative concessions.

See also
Candidates of the 1935 Victorian state election
1934 Victorian Legislative Council election

References

1935 elections in Australia
Elections in Victoria (Australia)
1930s in Victoria (Australia)
March 1935 events